The Citroën Survolt (later known as the DS Survolt) is a concept electric racing car produced by Citroën and presented at the 2010 Frankfurt Motor Show.

Overview

The Survolt is a full-sized racing car based on the earlier electric concept car Citroën Revolte presented at the 2009 Frankfurt Motor Show. Because the car runs on batteries, it is classed as a zero-emissions vehicle.

Design

The car has horizontal LED headlamps which have lower power consumption than traditional filament bulbs — important in a battery-operated vehicle.

At the back, the Survolt maintains the light cluster design used on the REVOLTe, and has a spoiler to increase rear downforce.

An Art Car based on the Survolt has been designed with the collaboration of Françoise Nielly in 2011.

Engine and drivetrain

Motorsports
The DS Survolt made its first appearance on a racetrack at Le Mans on 12 July 2010. Vanina Ickx was the first driver to get behind the wheel of the Survolt.

Although it has not been confirmed that the Survolt will ever be produced, there are rumors that Citroën wants to create a limited-production of a compact-sized concept based on this car, and start a one-make racing series.

Media appearances
The DS Survolt makes an appearance in Asphalt 6: Adrenaline (as the Citroën Survolt), Asphalt 8: Airborne and GT Racing 2: The Real Car Experience, all of which are mobile racing games by Gameloft. It's also available on Driveclub for PlayStation 4 as a free downloadable content.

The British automobile test-driving show Top Gear has driven the car around their famous test track and has given it high marks except for the fact that it is exceptionally hard to climb in and out of.

References

External links

Citroën
DS Automobiles
Top Gear drives the Citroën Survolt

Electric sports cars
Racing cars
Survolt
Rear mid-engine, all-wheel-drive vehicles